The 2010–11 WHL season is the 45th season of the Western Hockey League (WHL). The regular season began on September 24, 2010 and ended on March 20, 2011. The 2010 Subway Super Series, featuring Team WHL versus Team Russia, took place from November 17–18, 2010.

Regular season 
The 45th season of the WHL kicked off on September 24, 2010 with 8 games on the table. On February 21, the defending champions Calgary Hitmen hosted Regina Pats, who are Canada's oldest major-junior hockey team at McMahon Stadium for an outdoor game in conjunction with the NHL game, the WHL teams will wear retro inspired jerseys. The Spokane Chiefs also hosted the Kootenay Ice outdoors on January 15, 2011, being the first game of such. Broadcast partners including Rogers Sportsnet, Shaw TV and FSN return for coverage throughout the season, the teams will play 792 regular season games between September and March. The 2010–11 season was the first to be featured in EA Sports' NHL 11 video game including all the teams and rosters.

Standings

Conference standings

Division standings
 Eastern Conference

 Western Conference

x - team clinched Western Hockey League Playoff spot

y - team is division leader

z - team has clinched division

Statistical leaders

Scoring leaders 
Players are listed by points, then goals.

Note: GP = Games played; G = Goals; A = Assists; Pts. = Points; PIM = Penalty minutes

Goaltenders 
These are goaltenders that lead the league in GAA that have played at least 900 minutes.

Note: GP = Games played; Mins = Minutes played; W = Wins; L = Losses; OTL = Overtime losses; SOL = Shootout losses; SO = Shutouts; GAA = Goals against average; Sv% = Save percentage

Players

2010 NHL Entry Draft 
In total, 40 WHL players were selected at the 2010 NHL Entry Draft.

Transactions

Subway Super Series 
The Subway Super Series is a six-game series featuring four teams: three from the Canadian Hockey League (CHL) versus Russia's National Junior hockey team. Within the Canadian Hockey League umbrella, one team from each of its three leagues — the Ontario Hockey League, Quebec Major Junior Hockey League, and Western Hockey League — compete in two games against the Russian junior team.

The 2010 Subway Super Series was held in six cities across Canada, with two cities for each league within the Canadian Hockey League. The series begun on November 8, 2010, and concluded on November 18, 2010. Both Western Hockey League games were held in the province of British Columbia.

All six games were televised nationwide on Rogers Sportsnet, which broadcast both games from the Western Hockey League.

Results

2011 WHL Playoffs

Conference Quarter-finals

Eastern Conference

(1) Saskatoon Blades vs. (8) Prince Albert Raiders

(2) Red Deer Rebels vs. (7) Edmonton Oil Kings

(3) Medicine Hat Tigers vs. (6) Brandon Wheat Kings

(4) Kootenay Ice vs. (5) Moose Jaw Warriors

Western Conference

(1) Portland Winterhawks vs. (8) Everett Silvertips

(2) Kelowna Rockets vs. (7) Prince George Cougars

(3) Spokane Chiefs vs. (6) Chilliwack Bruins

(4) Tri-City Americans vs. (5) Vancouver Giants

Conference Semi-finals

Eastern Conference

(1) Saskatoon Blades vs. (4) Kootenay Ice

(2) Red Deer Rebels vs. (3) Medicine Hat Tigers

Western Conference

(1) Portland Winterhawks vs. (2) Kelowna Rockets

(3) Spokane Chiefs vs. (4) Tri-City Americans

Conference Finals

Eastern Conference

(3) Medicine Hat Tigers vs. (4) Kootenay Ice

Western Conference

(1) Portland Winterhawks vs. (3) Spokane Chiefs

WHL Championship

(E4) Kootenay Ice vs. Portland Winterhawks (W1)

Playoff scoring leaders
Note: GP = Games played; G = Goals; A = Assists; Pts = Points; PIM = Penalty minutes

Playoff leading goaltenders
Note: GP = Games played; Mins = Minutes played; W = Wins; L = Losses; GA = Goals Allowed; SO = Shutouts; SV& = Save percentage; GAA = Goals against average

Memorial Cup

WHL awards

All-Star Teams

Eastern Conference

Western Conference

See also 
 2011 Memorial Cup
 List of WHL seasons
 2010–11 OHL season
 2010–11 QMJHL season
 2010 in ice hockey
 2011 in ice hockey

References

External links 

 Official website of the Western Hockey League
 Official website of the Canadian Hockey League
 Official website of the MasterCard Memorial Cup
 Official website of the Subway Super Series

Western Hockey League seasons
WHL
WHL